Saint Mary's Parish (Sacred Heart Catholic Church) is a historic church at 515 Main Street in Red Bluff, California.

It was built in 1906 and added to the National Register in 1982.

See also
National Register of Historic Places listings in Tehama County, California

References

Roman Catholic churches in California
Red Bluff, California
Buildings and structures in Tehama County, California
Roman Catholic churches completed in 1906
Churches on the National Register of Historic Places in California
Roman Catholic Diocese of Sacramento
1900s architecture in the United States
Gothic Revival church buildings in California
Romanesque Revival church buildings in California
National Register of Historic Places in Tehama County, California
1906 establishments in California
20th-century Roman Catholic church buildings in the United States